Tsolo is a town in Mhlontlo Local Municipality in OR Tambo District of the Eastern Cape province of South Africa.

The town is some 42 km north-west of Mthatha and 22 km south-west of Qumbu. The name, derived from Xhosa, is said to mean ‘pointed’, referring to the shape of hills there.

Tsolo has two government hospitals, St Lucy's Hospital and Dr. Malizo Mpehle Memorial Hospital.

Notable people 
 Kedibone Letlaka-Rennert – Miss Transkei 1981 and Diversity Advisor at the International Monetary Fund
 Masizole Mnqasela – Western Cape Provincial Parliament
 Zozibini Tunzi – Miss Universe 2019
 Mandisa Maya - Female jurist
Ayanda Daweti - Actor

References

Populated places in the Mhlontlo Local Municipality